Gawaki is a village in Badakhshan Province in north-eastern Afghanistan.

References 

Populated places in Darayim District